Sally Helgesen (born July 1, 1948) is an American author, speaker and leadership coach.

Early life and education
Helgesen was born in Minnesota and grew up in Kalamazoo, Michigan. She attended Michigan State University, received her BA degree in English and Classics Hunter College (1973–75) and attended The Graduate Center of the City University of New York.

Career
In 1990, Helgesen published The Female Advantage: Women’s Ways of Leadership, the first book to focus on what women had to contribute as leaders rather than how they needed to change and adapt. The book became a best-seller and has remained continuously in print. In 1995, Helgesen published The Web of Inclusion: A New Architecture for Building Great Organizations, which has been heralded as having introduced the language of inclusion into the work environment. The book was regarded as one of the best books on leadership by The Wall Street Journal.

In 2018, she published How Women Rise with co-author Marshall Goldsmith. The book explores 12 habits that get in the way of women's success and how to overcome them. It became an international best-seller. Helgesen regularly delivers keynotes, seminars and workshops for corporations, partnership firms and associations around the world. She has also consulted with the UN on building more inclusive country offices and been visiting scholar at a number of schools and universities, both in the US and abroad. Helgesen was named one of the World’s Top Leadership Professionals for 2019 by Global Gurus. She is the recipient of the MEECO Coaching Consortium’s 2018 Award for Cultural Transformation and a member of the New York and International Women’s Forums.

Writing

Books

How Women Rise: Break the 12 Habits Holding You Back from Your Next Raise, Promotion or Job (with Marshall Goldsmith)
 The Female Vision: Women’s Real Power at Work (with Julie Johnson)
 The Web of Inclusion: A New Architecture for Building Great Organizations
Thriving in 24/7: Six Strategies for Taming the New World of Work
Everyday Revolutionaries: Working Women and the Transformation of American Life
The Female Advantage: Women’s Ways of Leadership
Wildcatters: A Story of Texas, Oil and Money

Personal life
Helgesen lives in Chatham, New York.

References

External links

American motivational speakers
Women motivational speakers
21st-century American women writers
1948 births
Living people
Graduate Center, CUNY alumni
Hunter College alumni
20th-century American women writers
Writers from Kalamazoo, Michigan
American speechwriters
Writers from Minnesota
Writers from New York City
Michigan State University alumni